|}

This is a list of Legislative Council results for the Victorian 1999 state election. 22 of the 44 seats were contested.

Results by province

Ballarat

Central Highlands

Chelsea

Doutta Galla

East Yarra

Eumemmerring

Geelong

Gippsland

Higinbotham

Jika Jika

Koonung

Melbourne

Melbourne North

Melbourne West

Monash

North Eastern

North Western

Silvan

South Eastern

Templestowe

Waverley

Western

By-elections 

There were a total of 3 Legislative Council by-elections that took place on election day following the resignation of MLCs elected at the 1996 election.

Ballarat 

This election was caused by the vacancy following the resignation of Rob Knowles, who unsuccessfully contested the lower house seat of Gisborne.

Melbourne 

This election was caused by the vacancy following the resignation of Barry Pullen.

Melbourne North 

This election was caused by the vacancy following the resignation of Caroline Hogg.

See also 

 1999 Victorian state election
 Candidates of the 1999 Victorian state election

References 

Results of Victorian state elections
1990s in Victoria (Australia)